Carlsen may also refer to:

People
 Carlsen, people with the surname

Places
 Carlsen Air Force Base, a United States military facility in Trinidad
Carlsen Island, part of the Svalbard archipelago

Organisations
 Carlsen Verlag, a Danish publishing house

See also
 Carlson (disambiguation)